Tippecanoe Township is one of fourteen townships in Carroll County, Indiana. As of the 2010 census, its population was 2,341 and it contained 1,186 housing units.

History
Tippecanoe Township was organized in 1830.

Carrollton Bridge was listed on the National Register of Historic Places in 2003.

Geography

Unincorporated towns
 Pittsburg

Adjacent townships
 Jefferson (north)
 Adams (northeast)
 Deer Creek (east)
 Washington Township, Tippecanoe County (south)
 Prairie Township, White County (west)

Major highways
  U.S. Route 421
  Indiana State Road 18

Cemeteries
The township contains two cemeteries: Benham and Pleasant Run.

References
 United States Census Bureau cartographic boundary files
 U.S. Board on Geographic Names

External links

 Indiana Township Association
 United Township Association of Indiana

Townships in Carroll County, Indiana
Lafayette metropolitan area, Indiana
Townships in Indiana
1830 establishments in Indiana